Route 126 is a  state highway in the U.S. state of Rhode Island. Route 126 is a heavily traveled route in Pawtucket. Its southern terminus is at U.S. Route 1 (US 1) in Providence, and its northern terminus is at the Massachusetts border where it continues as Massachusetts Route 126.

Route description
Route 126 begins at an intersection with Providence's Main Street, which is carried by US 1 and Route 122.  The northbound direction begins on Smithfield Avenue, and the southbound begins at Frost Street, turning towards Smithfield via Nashua Street.  Once the two meet, they travel the four-lane, divided Smithfield Avenue, very soon after interchanging with Interstate 95 and coming to an intersection with Silver Spring Road and Foch Avenue, where Route 126 turns right, continuing on Smithfield Avenue.  The route forms a skewed intersection with Power Road, afterwards narrowing to two lanes, and continues through a dense residential area as it skirts the west side of Pawtucket.

West of Lincoln Woods State Park and within the Lincoln town limits, Route 126 turns onto River Road, just south of Route 123, which it intersects shortly after.  It continues north, now known as River Road as it parallels the Blackstone River, which lies to the east.  South of Albion, the route's name changes to Old River Road at an intersection with Lower River Road, and it intersects Route 116 and flies over Interstate 295 with no access.  The route then enters Manville, where it curves westward before turning right at an intersection with Sayles Hill Road, continuing north.

Passing underneath Route 99 with no access, Route 126 meets New River Road's northern terminus, upon which the route's name changes again to Manville Road, cutting briefly across the North Smithfield town line.  As it enters Woonsocket, the road begins to parallel Blackstone River more closely, the two straddling a railroad alignment.  Within the city, the route turns eastward onto Hamlet Avenue, forming a concurrency with its Route 122.  The two routes then bridge the river and intersect Cumberland Street.  Here, Route 126 turns northward onto four lanes of Cumberland Street while Route 122 turns southward.  Eventually, Cumberland Street intersects Clinton Street and Social Street, where Route 126 turns eastward, using both streets for northbound and southbound, respectively.

Route 126's one-way pair merge into Social Street at an intersection with Elm Street shortly afterward.  The route then intersects Privilege Street, carrying Route 114.  Route 126 forms an overlap with Route 114, which it then releases at Diamond Hill Road.  Route 126 continues its final trek north to the Massachusetts state line, where the route continues as Massachusetts Route 126 and still carrying the name Social Street for a short distance into that state.

History
Prior to May 1962, Route 126 was in the Tiverton and Little Compton area.  It started at the intersection of present-day Route 179 and Route 81. It went north along Route 179 to present-day Route 77. It then went north on Route 77 to end at Route 138 near the eastern end of the now demolished Stone Bridge.

Major intersections

References

External links

2019 Highway Map, Rhode Island

126
Transportation in Providence County, Rhode Island